Margaret of Brieg (1342–1386) was a daughter of Ludwik I the Fair and his wife, Agnes of Sagan. She was Duchess consort of Bavaria by her marriage to Albert I, Duke of Bavaria.

Family 
Margaret was the eldest of six siblings, her brother was Henry VII of Brzeg and her sister, Hedwig was married to Jan II of Oświęcim.

Margaret's maternal grandparents were Henry IV the Faithful and Matilde of Brandenburg. Her paternal grandparents were Bolesław III the Generous and his first wife Margaret of Bohemia.

Margaret of Bohemia was the youngest surviving child of Wenceslaus II of Bohemia and Judith of Habsburg. Judith was the youngest daughter of Rudolf I of Germany and Gertrude of Hohenberg.

Marriage 
In Passau after 19 July 1353, Margaret and Albert were married. Albert kept mistresses and lovers, but during his reign, troubles erupted between parties because of a woman, Aleid van Poelgeest. People did not like her because she gained political influence which was resented. A few years after Margaret's death, Aleid was murdered in The Hague.

Even though Albert had mistresses and lovers, the couple still had seven children; all of the children lived to adulthood, this was very uncommon during the time, many offspring died in infancy and the mother may die during childbirth. Margaret and Louis had the following children:
 Katharina (c. 1361–1400, Hattem),  married in Geertruidenberg in 1379 William I of Gelders and Jülich
 Johanna (c. 1362–1386), wife of Wenceslaus, King of the Romans
 Margaret (1363 – 23 January 1423, Dijon),  married in Cambrai in 1385 John the Fearless
 William VI, Count of Holland (1365–1417)
 Albert II, Duke of Bavaria-Straubing (1369 – 21 January 1397, Kelheim)
 Joanna Sophia (c. 1373 – 15 November 1410, Vienna), married on 15 June 1395 Albert IV, Duke of Austria
 John, Count of Holland (1374/76 – 1425), Bishop of Liège

All of Margaret's daughters married into powerful royal families, one daughter, Johanna Sophia, was grandmother of Ladislaus the Posthumous. Another daughter, Margaret, was mother of Philip the Good, Duke of Burgundy

Death 
Margaret died in 1386, aged around 44, she left her husband a widower. Albert remarried after the death of Margaret, he married another women named Margaret, but she was from the Duchy of Cleves. Albert's only legitimate children were from Margaret of Brieg, he had no issue by Margaret of Cleves, but they held court together in The Hague. Margaret of Brieg was buried in the Court Chapel at the Binnenhof in The Hague.

Sources 
 
 

1342 births
1386 deaths
Piast dynasty
Countesses of Holland
Countesses of Hainaut
House of Wittelsbach
14th-century Polish nobility
14th-century Polish women 
14th-century German nobility
14th-century German women